László Ney (also known as Lancelot Ney) (26 July 1900, Budapest - 1965, Paris) was a Hungarian graphic artist.

He was a successful caricaturist already in his early life. In the Hungarian College of Fine Arts his teacher was István Réti. At the age of 22 he went to Germany to study abroad. In Germany he got to know Moholy-Nagy and through him Kurt Schwitters. First he worked as a graphic artist then as a painter. Michel Seuphor was a friend of his and he introduced Mondrian to Ney.

First he made objective cubist pictures then more abstract compositions. Beside figural pictures he made abstract painting, ink drawings, etchings. In his last years he studied more than 500 Chinese characters under the influence of them and Far Eastern art he made brush drawings.

External links
Biography in Hungarian
Biography in Hungarian

1900 births
1965 deaths
19th-century Hungarian painters
20th-century Hungarian painters
Hungarian male painters
19th-century Hungarian male artists
20th-century Hungarian male artists